Roxane Knetemann (born 1 April 1987 in Alkmaar) is a Dutch former professional racing cyclist, who rode professionally between 2006 and 2019 for the , Vrienden van het Platteland,  and  teams.

Her father was famous cyclist Gerrie Knetemann.

Major results

2004
 2nd Time trial, National Junior Road Championships
 UCI Junior Road World Championships
5th Road race
6th Time trial
2005
 National Track Championships
3rd Scratch
3rd Individual pursuit
3rd Points race
2006
 9th Overall Novilon Damesronde van Drenthe
2007
 4th Omloop van Borsele
2009
 National Track Championships
1st  Points race 
2nd Madison (with Amy Pieters)
2010
 National Track Championships
1st  Madison (with Amy Pieters)
2nd Scratch
2011
 National Track Championships
3rd Scratch
3rd Points race
2012
 National Track Championships
1st  Madison (with Marianne Vos)
1st  Points race
 9th Overall Ster Zeeuwsche Eilanden
 10th 7-Dorpenomloop Aalburg
2013
 2nd  Team time trial, UCI Road World Championships
 National Track Championships
3rd Scratch
3rd Points race
 7th Overall La Route de France
 7th Grand Prix de Dottignies
 7th 7-Dorpenomloop Aalburg
 7th Open de Suède Vårgårda
 9th Omloop Het Nieuwsblad
 10th Overall Thüringen Rundfahrt der Frauen
2014
 2nd Open de Suède Vårgårda TTT
 3rd GP du Canton d'Argovie
 3rd Open de Suède Vårgårda
 4th Holland Hills Classic
 5th Gent–Wevelgem
 8th Overall Ladies Tour of Norway
 8th Ronde van Gelderland
 10th Overall Energiewacht Tour
2015
 3rd  Team time trial, UCI Road World Championships
 6th Gent–Wevelgem
 6th Ronde van Overijssel
 7th La Flèche Wallonne Féminine
 8th Overall Holland Ladies Tour
 8th Le Samyn des Dames
 8th Marianne Vos Classic
 8th Time trial, EPZ Omloop van Borsele
 9th Overall Energiewacht Tour
 10th Omloop Het Nieuwsblad
2016
 1st  Mountains classification Holland Ladies Tour
 3rd Time trial, National Road Championships
 Crescent Vårgårda UCI Women's WorldTour
3rd Team time trial
10th Road race
 8th Overall Energiewacht Tour
2017
 1st  Combativity classification Healthy Ageing Tour
 7th Overall Thüringen Rundfahrt der Frauen
 9th Women's Tour de Yorkshire

References

External links

1987 births
Living people
Dutch track cyclists
Dutch female cyclists
Sportspeople from Alkmaar
UCI Road World Championships cyclists for the Netherlands
Cyclists from North Holland
20th-century Dutch women
21st-century Dutch women